Niel may refer to:

Niel, Belgium, town and municipality located in the Belgian province of Antwerp
Niel Jaarmarkt Cyclo-cross, cyclo-cross race held in Niel, Belgium, and part of the Cyclo-cross Gazet van Antwerpen
Prix Niel, Group 2 flat horse race in France 
Antoniel dos Santos, Brazilian footballer known as Niel
Niel (singer), South Korean member of boy group Teen Top

People with the surname
Adolphe Niel (1802–1869), French Army general and statesman, also Marshal of France
C. B. van Niel (1897–1985), Dutch-American microbiologist
Herms Niel (1888–1954), German composer
Marthe Niel (1878–1928), French aviator
Xavier Niel (born 1967), French entrepreneur and businessman

See also
Niall
Neil
Niels (disambiguation)

French-language surnames